Maher Bin Hamad Bin Muhammad Bin Al-Mu'aiqly Al-Balawi (born 7 January 1969) is an Imam and preacher of the Grand Mosque of Mecca, Masjid al-Haram.

Achievements 
Maher graduated from the Teachers College in Madinah where he studied mathematics and moved to work in Makkah Al-Mukarramah as a teacher. He then became a student guide at Prince Abdul Majeed School in Makkah. He holds a master's degree in 1425 AH in the jurisprudence of Imam Ahmad bin Hanbal at the College of Shari'a at Umm Al-Qura University and obtained a doctorate in interpretation. He works as an assistant professor in the Judicial Studies Department at the College of Judicial Studies and Regulations at Umm Al-Qura University.  and holds the position of Vice Dean for Graduate Studies and Scientific Research.

The thesis was entitled: Imam Ahmad Ibn Hanbal Jurisprudence Issues according to the narration of Abd al-Malik al-Maimouni (collection and study). He obtained his doctorate from Umm Al-Qura University in the year of 1432 AH, which is the research of the book (Tuhfat Al-Nabih, Sharh Al-Tanbih) on Borders and Districts (by Imam Shirazi in Shafi’i jurisprudence).

He also obtained a doctorate thesis entitled The Prophet's Masterpiece in Explanation of the Warning to Al-Zanklouni Al-Shafi'i, a Study and research of the Chapter on Borders and the Judiciary. The thesis was discussed in the King Abdul Aziz Hall. He obtained his doctorate in jurisprudence on 28 Muharram 1434, the Hijri equivalent to 12 December 2012 Gregorian.

Imam of Grand Mosque
He led the sermon of Al-Saadi Mosque in Al-Awali district in Makkah Al-Mukarramah.
He assumed the leadership of the prayer at the Prophet's Mosque during the Holy month of Ramadan in the years of 1426 AH and 1427 AH.
And he led the Tarawih and Tahajjud prayers at the Grand Mosque during the month of Ramadan in 1428 AH, and he was appointed as an official Imam of the Grand Mosque in that year to date.

See also
 Abdul-Rahman Al-Sudais
 Umm al-Qura University

References

Living people
Saudi Arabian Sunni Muslims
Saudi Arabian imams
1969 births